June Gittelson (May 6, 1910November 28, 1993) was an American film actress. She appeared in more than 70 films between 1928 and 1945.

Career
Due to her rotund figure, Gittelson was often cast as a love interest who often intimidated her husband or boyfriend. Modern viewers will recognize Gittelson in her appearances in several early Three Stooges films such as Slippery Silks, Dizzy Doctors, Horse Collars and The Sitter Downers. Perhaps her most famous role was as Minnie in the Stooge film False Alarms, in which she played the large and man-hungry lady pursuing the affections of a reluctant Curly Howard. Curly memorably contacts Moe and Larry, saying "Hello, Moe? You'd better come over. You're missing one of the biggest things in your life!" To her remark, "I grow on people!",  Curly responds, "so do warts!" Her line as she is getting into a car with the Stooges: "Let's go places and eat things!"

Gittelson also appeared in many non-Stooges films, usually in minor roles and seldom credited. Feature films in which she played character parts include King Kong (1933), Mark of the Vampire (1935), and Mr. Smith Goes to Washington (1939).

Death
Gittelson died in Northridge, California on November 28, 1993, aged 83.

Partial filmography

References

External links

1910 births
1993 deaths
American film actresses
20th-century American actresses
Burials at Los Angeles National Cemetery